Brand Hollow Road Stone Arch Bridge is a historic stone arch bridge located at West Durham in Greene County, New York. It was constructed by Jeremiah Cunningham in 1892–1893, and is a single span, dry laid limestone bridge with a round arch. It is eight feet wide, with a span of four and a half feet.

It was listed on the National Register of Historic Places in 2008.

References

Road bridges on the National Register of Historic Places in New York (state)
Bridges completed in 1892
Bridges in Greene County, New York
National Register of Historic Places in Greene County, New York
Stone arch bridges in the United States